The Leadville Limestone is a Mississippian geologic formation in the western United States. In Colorado, the upper part is oolitic limestone, while the lower part is primarily dolomite, and somewhat sandy beds indicate the bottom of the formation.

The formation is sparsely fossiliferous but contains many calcareous algae, Foraminifera (Endothyra), sponges, corals (Syringopora), Bryozoa, many brachiopods, gastropods (Bellerophon, Straparolus), Cephalopoda, fragments of ostracods, abundant fragments of crinoids, echinoid spines, and teeth of fish.

A metamorphic facies of this formation is known as the Yule Marble and has been quarried for construction materials.

See also

 List of fossiliferous stratigraphic units in Colorado
 Paleontology in Colorado

References

Carboniferous Colorado
Carboniferous southern paleotropical deposits